Hylodes amnicola is a species of frogs in the family Hylodidae.

It is endemic to Brazil.
Its natural habitats are subtropical or tropical moist lowland forest and rivers.

References

Hylodes
Endemic fauna of Brazil
Amphibians of Brazil
Frogs of South America
Amphibians described in 2002
Taxonomy articles created by Polbot